Fjelsted is a town located on the island of Funen in south Denmark, in Middelfart Municipality. Fjelsted is located next to the Funen Motorway three kilometers south of Harndrup, 20 kilometers east of Middelfart and 28 kilometers west of Odense.

Sport
The town includes the Speedway stadium known as the Fjelsted Speedway Stadium, which is the home of Fjelsted Speedway Klub who race in the Danish Speedway League. It is found south of the town by the village of Fjelsted.

References 

Cities and towns in the Region of Southern Denmark
Middelfart Municipality